CDT or CdT may refer to:

Medicine
Carbohydrate deficient transferrin, a transporter protein isoform typically increased in alcoholism
Compulsory drug test
Current Dental Terminology, a coding system of the American Dental Association
Cytolethal distending toxin, a bacterial genotoxin produced by Gram-negative bacteria
Clock drawing test
Clostridioides Difficile Toxin test that detects Clostridium difficile toxin A and Clostridium difficile toxin B

Chemistry
Cyclododecatriene, a cycloalkene used in the production of polyamides

Organisations
Canadian Deaf Theatre
CD Tenerife (Club Deportivo Tenerife), a Spanish football club
C.D. Tondela (Clube Desportivo de Tondela), a Portuguese football club
Center for Democracy and Technology
Centre for Doctoral Training or Doctoral Training Centre, an organisation of PhD programmes at UK universities
Children's Dance Theatre, University of Utah
China Datang Corporation, a power generation business in the People's Republic of China
China Digital Times, a bilingual news website covering Chinese politics
Confédération Démocratique du Travail:
Democratic Confederation of Labour (DRC), a trade union in the Democratic Republic of the Congo
Democratic Confederation of Labour (Morocco), a trade union
Crimson Dance Team, of Harvard College
Translation Centre for the Bodies of the European Union (Centre de Traduction des Organes de l'Union Européenne)

Other
Cañon Diablo troilite (pyrrhotite), a standard for comparing sulfur isotopes
Causal dynamical triangulation, an approach to quantum gravity
Causal decision theory, a school of thought within decision theory

Central Daylight Time
Australia Central Daylight Time, a time zone in Australia
Central Daylight Time, observed in the North American Central Time Zone
CDT (TV station), a TV station in remote eastern and central Australia
Centre Daily Times, a newspaper for Centre County, Pennsylvania
Conceptual dependency theory
Constrained Delaunay triangulation
Continental Divide Trail
Craft, Design and Technology, a subject in schools in the United Kingdom
Eclipse C/C++ Development Tooling, see Eclipse (software)
IATA code of Castellón–Costa Azahar Airport
MRT station abbreviation of Caldecott MRT station
Colorado Department of Transportation